This was the first edition of the tournament, primarily organised due to the cancellation of many tournaments in 2020, due to the Covid-19 pandemic.

Laslo Đere won the title, defeating Marco Cecchinato in the final, 7–6(7–3), 7–5.

Seeds
The top four seeds received a bye into the second round.

Draw

Finals

Top half

Bottom half

Qualifying

Seeds

Qualifiers

Lucky losers

Qualifying draw

First qualifier

Second qualifier

Third qualifier

Fourth qualifier

References

External links
Main Draw
Qualifying Draw

2020 ATP Tour
2020 Singles